Adelina Ismaili (born 14 December 1979) is a Kosovo-Albanian singer, actress, and former beauty pageant winner.

Career
Ismaili started singing at a very young age, becoming one of Kosovo's most influential singers during the 90s. She started competing in various children's festivals in the Albanian territories, such as the Akordet e Kosovës, Festivali i këngës për fëmijë në RTSH and many others. During her teenage years, Adelina released many songs that spoke about children's rights and the lives of teenagers. She was one of the first singers in Kosovo who managed to touch topics that others of her age couldn't.

After taking a short break, Adelina released other songs that created a whole new era in the Albanian music industry, bringing new styles of dressing and singing on stage, which had never been seen before. She is also highly recognised as a sex symbol for her provocative videos and performances on Albanian local television stations. Her songs that brought a lot of attention were: "Amaneti", "Qe 1 vjet e 7 ditë", and "Shota". She sang a lot of songs dedicated to the victims of the Kosovo War, for instance "Lavdi ushtarit tim" (Honor to My Soldier). Adelina was crowned Miss Kosovo in 1997.

Discography
Ismaili's records, including four chart-topping albums (100% zeshkane, S'jam sex bombë, Prej fillimit and Mbretëreshë e robëreshë) were instant successes and became best sellers in Albania, in the Albanian-speaking regions of the former Yugoslavia, and in the Albanian diaspora.

Album's 
 1996: 100 % Zeshkane
 2000: S'jam Sex Bombë
 2002: Prej Fillimit
 2005: Mbretëreshë E Robëreshë
 2007: Feniks

Singles 
 1996: Shko
 1996: Me Motor
 1996: 100 % Zeshkane
 1996: Po nanës Tendë Çka i Bana
 1996: Ushtrinë Time Do ta Bej
 1996: Sajzeza (Feat. Elita 5)
 1998: Shko në R.S
 1999: Lavdi Ushtari Im
 1999: Uragan Çohen Krenarët
 1999: Martesa
 2000: Sonte
 2000: Amaneti
 2000: You are my Angel
 2000: Fuck the Government
 2000: Largohu nga Frajeri im
 2000: Sex Bombë
 2002: Mos ma ndal
 2002: Dil E Shij Moj Bije
 2003: Skenderbe
 2003: Në Kosovë Luhet Kumorë (Ft. Tingulli 3nt)
 2005: Dy Motra një Frajer
(Ft. Zanfina Ismaili)
 2006: Mirëdita
 2007: Diva
 2008: Trimit Tim
 2009: Tribalb
 2010: Urdhër i Ri 
 2011: Love You More ft. Faudel
 2012: Ku Ma Ke
 2014: Karma
 2018: T'Iqja

References

1979 births
Living people
Kosovan singers
Musicians from Pristina
Albanian tallava singers
Kosovan beauty pageant winners
Albanian pop musicians